Codium tenue is a species of seaweed in the Codiaceae family.

In Western Australia is found along the coast in one small area in the South West region.

References

tenue
Plants described in 1956
Taxa named by Friedrich Traugott Kützing